This a list of 171 film scores by the Italian composer Nino Rota (1911–1979). The films are categorized by release date, the original title, English title, alternate title (other language, regional, theatrical or DVD title), and film director.

See also
List of compositions by Nino Rota
Nino Rota discography

External links
 Nino Rota's website
 
 Nino Rota: Filmography Retrieved 30 June 2012.

 
Rota, Nino, List of film scores